Louise (Bourgeois) Boursier (1563–1636) was a French Royal Court midwife who delivered babies for many women in her twenty-six year professional career. Marie de Médicis, the wife of Henry the Great of France, was one of her patients, and Bourgeois delivered her six children. Bourgeois' income was about ten times the average midwife's. She believed she was blessed with practical midwifery talents from Phaenarete, the mother of Socrates.

Bourgeois was known as a scholar and educator. Through her common-sense-based medical methods and prodigious writings, she helped raise midwifery to state of the art science. She was the first woman to write a book on obstetrics, which was further expanded with other more detailed medical works by her and her descendants and colleagues. These works were used by medical professionals in several countries.

Early life 
Bourgeois was given the first name of Louise when she was born in 1563 in what was then a farming area outside of Paris called the Faubourg Saint-Germain. Her family was not of noble ancestry, but her father was a builder who constructed houses at the village of Bussy, fifteen miles north of Paris. She was raised in upper middle-class circumstances and received a good education. Bourgeois' family was part of the growing bourgeois class.

Bourgeois' family lived near the barber surgeon medical professional Martin Boursier, who was a pupil-assistant of Ambroise Paré. Bourgeois married Martin Boursier at the parish of Saint Sulpice in 1584. They moved to Faubourg Saint-Germain sometime between 1586 and 1587. The couple had a comfortable life style there, and their three children were born by September 1589.

When King Henry IV attacked Paris in October 1589, Bourgeois was home alone with her three children, and her husband was out of the country away on duty in the army. She abandoned her rural home and most of their possessions to retreat with her children and mother behind the city walls of Paris for protection. For an income, Bourgeois then took up needlework and sold items she embroidered in addition to pieces of valuable personal items she had managed to save. This was barely enough income to support her family. This would eventually lead her to take up midwifery.

Bourgeois' husband returned from the army around 1591, but his income as a medical doctor was not enough to support the family. When she had their third and last child, her nurse at the time suggested she go into midwifery. She took up midwifery part-time in the 1580s, and by 1593, she had joined the Guild of Midwives as a professional. Bourgeois learned this medical skill from the writings on obstetrics by her husband and Paré. She also went to a new college for midwives at the hospital Hôtel-Dieu de Paris and was one of the first to graduate from the school.  Being married to Martin created some advantages for Boursier. For example, her husband was a barber-surgeon allowing her to learn advanced techniques and other knowledge, which aided her in standing out among other midwives. At the time, Boursier's husband was a surgeon, and due to the friction between physicians, surgeons, and midwives, people's perceptions on Boursier were affected.

Career 

Bourgeois didn't take the traditional career path to being a midwife. At the time it was common for women to become midwives after their childbearing years. This was done by having an apprenticeship with an experienced midwife.  At thirty-one Boursier began her journey to becoming a midwife. As opposed to apprenticing with an experienced midwife, Bourgeois observed the work of Ambroise Pare, a French surgeon, for 5 years as well as working to serve the lower and middle class communities. This was very helpful for her when she obtained a diploma and license to legally practice midwifery on 12 November 1598, which is when she passed the examination for that profession and became a registered midwife. The judging panel consisted of a medical doctor, two barber-surgeons, and two well respected professional midwives. She then moved with her family into a fashionable house on the Left Bank at the rue Saint-Andre´des-Arts. There she built up a large scale medical practice in what was known then as the Latin Quarter. She developed an excellent reputation in the delivery of two thousand babies and was well liked as a professional midwife. Making connections with the elite women and physicians of Paris, Bourgeois was able to advance her career and fame as a midwife. She was known as a foundation level scholar and educationalist because of her advanced knowledge in the field which she documented in various manuscripts. With her husband, she headed a minor medical dynasty and pharmacy that ran down through her family and lasted for decades.

Henry the Great of France married Marie de' Medici in 1600. Their first child was due in 1601. Henry wanted Madame Dupuis to be the midwife for the first child. After attending an appointment, receiving recommendations from physicians, and receiving the support of many aristocratic women, Boursier was officially appointed as the royal midwife after convincing Henry IV that she was the woman for the job. Only a mere three years after passing her exam in 1958 she was appointed as the royal midwife. Boursier saw this as an opportunity presented to her by God. She had successfully assisted the childbirths of several young ladies of the Royal Court as a loyal professional midwife. Bourgeois wrote of her experience with this first childbirth of Queen Marie in her 1617 book True accounts of the births of the royal children of France. She referred to herself as "la premiere femme de mon art qui mette la plume en main" (the first woman of my art to take pen in hand). As the royal midwife, Boursier was respected by the king as much as his own physicians. After the successful birth of the dauphin, Louis XIII, Boursier's name was pushed into the public light. With this momentum, Boursier would end up publishing a number of works on pregnant women, pharmacy, and diagnosing illnesses.

Bourgeois was the midwife to Marie de' Medici when she had her six children between 1601 and 1610. Henry IV was killed in 1610. Marie de' Medici's children were Louis XIII, future King of France (1601), Elizabeth, Queen of Spain (1602), Christine Marie, Duchess of Savoy (1607), Nicolas Henri, Duke of Orléans (1607), Gaston, Duke of Orléans (1608), and Henrietta Maria, Queen of England, Queen of Scots and Queen of Ireland (1609). Bourgeois was paid 500 crowns for each son delivered and 300 crowns for each daughter delivered. The average midwife at the time had an income of 50 crowns for each delivery. Bourgeois' career as a royal court midwife spanned over twenty-six years.

Later life 

In 1608, Bourgeois was awarded a lump sum of 6,000 livres for her services as royal midwife. After the birth of Henrietta Maria, the last child, Bourgeois asked for a pension of 600 livres per year. King Henry IV agreed in 1610 to 300 livres, which was considered a reasonable retirement income. In her retirement from being the royal midwife, Bourgeois wrote a great deal and made important contributions to obstetrics. She wrote a book on childbirth practices in 1609 titled Various Observations on the Sterility. Bourgeois was the first woman to write a book on midwifery.

The last section of her 1609 book contains Bourgeois' opinions on various topics specifically written for her daughter. She told her to fear God, to attend the poor with charity, and to never let unmarried women into her house for confinement or to assist in abortions. She also criticized the women of her time for preferring male physicians to midwives. Additional techniques and information were added in 1759 by her descendant, Angelique le Boursier du Courdray, who was also a royal French midwife. She in turn passed this knowledge down to poor women of her time.

Although she was technically retired as a royal midwife, Bourgeois still delivered children. However, as it was with being a woman, much less a midwife, Boursier's fame did not come without scrutiny or risk. In 1627, she delivered the child of Princess Marie de Bourbon-Montpensier, Louis XIII's sister-in-law. Unfortunately, the princess died from fever after her labor. Marie de Médicis ordered an autopsy report after the incident. Male physicians (many of whom were enemies of Bourgeois) wrote the autopsy report and said that a piece of afterbirth was left on the womb implying that Bourgeois was at fault for the Duchess' death. In response to this, Bourgeois wrote the "Apology of Louise Bourgeois" in which she questioned the validity of the report. Angered by the results of the autopsy report, Boursier claimed that the physicians who were in the birthing room were not allowed to be present while the autopsy was being done. In her 'apology,' Bourgeois highlighted her many qualifications and said she had practiced the midwife profession for thirty-four years. She pointed out that she honorably acquired the proper certificate and wrote books on midwifery that were used by physicians in several countries. She self proclaimed herself the first female midwife to write on the subject of midwifery.  Eventually, the backlash from the situation fell on Boursier, ending her career as a midwife.

In conclusion, Louise Bourgeois had many achievements in the medical profession and state department. She was a renowned author and midwife for royal families. Bourgeois was able to advocate for midwives to be considered into the medical hierarchy, even after the downfall of her career.

Works 

Bourgeois wrote five medical manuscripts between 1609 and 1634 and advocated that the clinical information contained in them be practiced by all midwives. Her first book on midwifery and childbirth had practical information on obstetrics. Few texts of this type existed at the time. This book contained references to some 2000 childbirths and was published in Latin, German, Dutch, and English until the 1700s. Her first expanded edition had a short autobiography, and other later editions had medical cures for skin ailments and pain. Her first three manuscripts were different volumes titled Diverse Observations on Sterility, Miscarriage, Fertility, Childbirth, and the Diseases of Women and Newborn Children.

 1609 - Various Observations on the Sterility, a medical textbook on midwifery giving procedure steps. Includes case studies on difficult deliveries.
 1617 - Diverse Observations, expanded edition of above obstetrical theory with additional medical recipes + 'Advice to my Daughter'.
 1626 – Diverse Observations, expanded edition of above obstetrical theory with treatments for anemia. Includes details from Bourgeois' perspective on her journey becoming a midwife to the Queen as well as the first birth she performed for the queen.
 1634 – Collection of Secrets, expanded edition of above obstetrical theory with podalic version advice.
 1642 –  Diverse Observations, expanded edition of above obstetrical theory with infant care guidelines.
 1652 –  Diverse Observations, expanded edition of above obstetrical theory with augmented treatments.

See also
 Timeline of women in science

References

Sources

 
 
 
 
 
 
 
 
 
 
 
 

1563 births
1636 deaths
French midwives
French science writers
French women scientists
Writers from Paris
Women science writers
Women medical researchers
16th-century women scientists
16th-century French scientists
17th-century women scientists
17th-century French scientists
17th-century French women writers
17th-century French writers